FC Frauenfeld is a Swiss football team that currently plays in 2. Liga Interregional, the fifth tier in the Swiss football pyramid. The club was founded in 1906. They finished the 2008/2009 season in 13th position in Group 5 resulting in relegation from the 2. Liga Interregional down to the sixth tier, the 2. Liga. However, the club improved over the years, and by the start of the 2015–16 season they were back into the 2. Liga Interregional.

References

External links
Official Website 

Association football clubs established in 1906
Frauenfeld
Frauenfeld
1906 establishments in Switzerland